Lindblad Expeditions (Lindblad Expeditions-National Geographic) is an expedition travel company headquartered in New York, NY. The company currently offers expedition cruises to destinations on all seven continents aboard 15 ships with capacities ranging from 28 to 150 guests.

History

Lindblad Travel (1958–1989)

Lars-Eric Lindblad founded Lindblad Travel in Connecticut in 1958. Lindblad Travel led the first tourist expedition to Antarctica in 1966 and was among the first companies to bring tourists to the Galápagos Islands starting in 1967. Later, after launching the first private, purpose-built expedition ship, the Lindblad Explorer (1969), it pioneered tourist expeditions to the Arctic, Tierra del Fuego, the Falkland Islands, the Seychelles, Easter Island, Indonesia, the Amazon River, and many others. In 1984 Lindblad Travel led the first tourist expedition through the Northwest Passage from Newfoundland to the Bering Strait.

Regarded as the father of ecotourism, Lars-Eric Lindblad believed strongly that travel to difficult-to-reach places encouraged a desire to preserve and protect the planet. In addition to leading expeditions in remote wilderness areas, Lindblad Travel also led trips to hard-to-visit countries such as China, Vietnam, and Cambodia. The company ceased operations in 1989.

Special Expeditions (1979–2001)

Lars-Eric Lindblad passed along his passions for adventure, exploration, and conservation to his son, Sven-Olof Lindblad, who joined him on expeditions from an early age. In 1979 Sven-Olof Lindblad founded Special Expeditions as a subsidiary of Lindblad Travel. Special Expeditions decoupled from Lindblad Travel in 1982 and was renamed Lindblad Expeditions in 2000.

Lindblad Expeditions-National Geographic (2004–present)

Since 2004, Lindblad Expeditions has partnered with National Geographic and is now cobranded in the Americas and Oceania as Lindblad Expeditions-National Geographic. This alliance pairs Lindblad expedition leaders, naturalists, and historians with National Geographic scientists, oceanographers, writers, photo instructors, and filmmakers. Itineraries operated by Lindblad are also sold by National Geographic Expeditions, and Lindblad-owned vessels in the fleet feature “National Geographic” in their names. 

Lindblad Expeditions-National Geographic went public in July 2015. It trades on Nasdaq under the ticker symbol LIND.

In 2016, Lindblad purchased a controlling interest in Natural Habitat, Inc., an ecotourism company based in Boulder, Colorado, that specializes in land-based tours. In 2021, Lindblad further expanded its brand portfolio to include Bozeman, Montana-based travel company Off the Beaten Path; DuVine Cycling + Adventure Co, a Boston-based company specializing in cycling tours; and Classic Journeys, which specializes in luxury walking tours.  

Sven Lindblad retired as CEO in 2021. The current CEO is Dolf Berle.

Sustainability & Charitable Initiatives
 
In 1998, Sven Lindblad developed the Galápagos Conservation Fund, which supported local conservation and scientific efforts through contributions from passengers aboard Lindblad ships in the Galápagos. In 2005, Lindblad began a program called OPUS (Operation to Prevent Unwanted Species) which implemented new practices designed to prevent the introduction of invasive species via food imported to the ships.

The Lindblad Expeditions-National Geographic Fund for conservation and research raises more than $2 million annually, primarily through guest donations, to support projects such as scholarships for students in the Galápagos and the purchase of tags for scientists studying killer whales in the waters surrounding the Antarctic Peninsula. Over the years, guests have contributed more than $15 million to support Lindblad’s global stewardship efforts.

In 2019, Lindblad Expeditions announced plans to become entirely carbon neutral by the end of the year. That same year, in conjunction with National Geographic’s “Planet or Plastic” campaign, the company banned all single-use plastics aboard its ships.

Fleet

Lindblad Expeditions-National Geographic currently operates a fleet of ten owned vessels and five charter vessels. Ships owned by Lindblad Expeditions bear names beginning with “National Geographic.”  Its most recent new builds include the National Geographic Endurance and National Geographic Resolution, which launched in 2021 and operate primarily in the Arctic and Antarctica.

In 2021, Lindblad Expeditions purchased the Crystal Esprit and refurbished it, rechristening it National Geographic Islander II. The ship began operations in the Galápagos in August 2022.

Current fleet (owned)

Current fleet (leased)

Former fleet

References 

Tourism in Antarctica
Expedition cruising